Amna Nurhusein is the minister of health in Eritrea. She was elevated to this position in 2009. She served as the minister of tourism between 2001 and 2009.

References

Living people
People's Front for Democracy and Justice politicians
Government ministers of Eritrea
Women government ministers of Eritrea
Year of birth missing (living people)